Kadivar is an Iranian surname. Notable people with the surname include:

 Jamileh Kadivar (born 1963), Iranian politician
 Mohsen Kadivar (born 1959), Iranian philosopher and professor
 Nima Kadivar (born 1994), Swedish futsal player

Persian-language surnames